Wood County is a county located in the U.S. state of Wisconsin. As of the 2020 census, the population was 74,207. Its county seat is Wisconsin Rapids. The county is named after Joseph Wood, a member of the Wisconsin State Assembly. Wood County comprises the Wisconsin Rapids-Marshfield, WI Micropolitan Statistical Area and is included in the Wausau-Stevens Point-Wisconsin Rapids, WI Combined Statistical Area.

Geography
The geographic center of Wisconsin is in Wood County, nine miles southeast of Marshfield.

Wood County spans two of Wisconsin's five geographical regions. The northern part of the county is in the Northern Highlands, with mostly rich cropland with heavy clay soil, used for corn, soybeans, hay and dairy. In the northwest corner the Marshfield moraine runs from Marathon County through Marshfield, Bakerville and Nasonville into Clark County. The south and central areas from Babcock through Cranmoor and Wisconsin Rapids are in the Central Plain, flat and marshy - one of the major cranberry-producing centers of the United States. The Wisconsin River cuts across the southeast corner, a corridor of sand flats, islands and oxbows. The river falls about 120 feet as it flows through the county, driving several power dams. The remainder of the county is drained by smaller streams and rivers, punctuated by isolated hills like Powers Bluff.

The flat, sandy southern third of the county was largely shaped by the last glacial advance. The ice didn't reach Wood County, but it approached from the east into Portage County and butted up against the Baraboo Hills to the south. This blocked the Wisconsin River, damming it so that it backed up, forming Glacial Lake Wisconsin, a frigid lake that stretched from the Baraboo Hills north to the sites of Babcock and Wisconsin Rapids, submerging that part of the county. This area is generally flat and marshy now because meltwater rivers from the glacier and streams from land to the north carried sand and silt out into the glacial lake, where the sediment settled beneath its still waters. After the glacial dam melted enough to drain Glacial Lake Wisconsin around 13,000 years ago, the Wisconsin River cut new channels through the lake-bottom sands in the southeast corner of the county. In a later dry period, wind blew the sand into dunes. One dune in the town of Saratoga is eight meters thick. Later still, the area became wet and peat formed in places on top of the sand. The first surveyors in 1852 found a great marsh, like a Wisconsin Everglades. Here is their description of what is now Cranmoor:
This Township is very nearly all covered either with Marsh or swamp there is not to exceed in the Township two Sections of land that would admit of cultivation...  Timber on Swamp Tamarack & small Spruce(?) very thick. water from 6 to 20 inches deep, the marsh is covered with a light crop of grass, water from 12 to 40 inches deep, innumerable small Islands(?) interspered over this Town, the margins of which abound with Cranberries.

The north of the county was shaped by earlier glaciers, which deposited glacial till, the basis for the heavy soil there. The Marshfield moraine in the northwest corner is probably a terminal moraine from one of these earlier glaciers, or from a series of them. Its age is unclear, but its relatively smooth surface indicates that it has eroded for a much longer time than the choppy terminal moraines left 13,000 years ago, like the Perkinstown moraine near Medford.

Much of the county except for the northeast corner is underlain by a layer of Cambrian sandstone, formed long before the last ice age. Most of the original sandstone layer has been eroded away and the remainder is usually buried under glacial till, but it can be seen in gravel pits and a few bluffs. The Lindsey bluffs (a.k.a. the Marshfield School Forest) and Birch Bluff and South Bluff in the Town of Remington are hard spots in this sandstone which have resisted erosion.

Powers Bluff is different from the sandstone bluffs, much older, with a hard core of Precambrian quartzite and a peak of chert. A marker on the bluff says it is a "worn down peak of an ancient mountain range which once covered northern Wisconsin."

Adjacent counties
 Marathon County - north
 Portage County - east
 Adams County - southeast
 Juneau County - south
 Jackson County - southwest
 Clark County - northwest

Natural wildlife refuges
 Mead Wildlife Area

Demographics

2020 census
As of the census of 2020, the population was 74,207. The racial makeup of the county was 91.4% White, 1.9% Asian, 0.8% Native American, 0.8% Black or African American, 1.3% from other races, and 3.8% from two or more races. Ethnically, the population was 3.2% Hispanic or Latino of any race.

2000 census
As of the census of 2000, there were 75,555 people, 30,135 households, and 20,491 families residing in the county. The population density was 95 people per square mile (37/km2). There were 31,691 housing units at an average density of 40 per square mile (15/km2). The racial makeup of the county was 96.43% White, 0.27% Black or African American, 0.70% Native American, 1.61% Asian, 0.01% Pacific Islander, 0.30% from other races, and 0.69% from two or more races. 0.94% of the population were Hispanic or Latino of any race. 50.8% were of German, 8.5% Polish, 6.2% Norwegian, 5.2% American and 5.1% Irish ancestry.

There were 30,135 households, out of which 32.20% had children under the age of 18 living with them, 56.70% were married couples living together, 8.00% had a female householder with no husband present, and 32.00% were non-families. 27.20% of all households were made up of individuals, and 11.40% had someone living alone who was 65 years of age or older. The average household size was 2.47 and the average family size was 3.01.

In the county, the population was spread out, with 25.70% under the age of 18, 7.70% from 18 to 24, 28.40% from 25 to 44, 22.90% from 45 to 64, and 15.30% who were 65 years of age or older. The median age was 38 years. For every 100 females there were 96.10 males. For every 100 females age 18 and over, there were 93.00 males.

In 2017, there were 843 births, giving a general fertility rate of 69.1 births per 1000 women aged 15–44, the 19th highest rate out of all 72 Wisconsin counties. Of these, 16 of the births occurred at home. Additionally, there were 59 reported induced abortions performed on women of Wood County residence in 2017, a figure higher than the records for the preceding four years.

Transportation

Major highways

  U.S. Highway 10
  Highway 13 (Wisconsin)
  Highway 34 (Wisconsin)
  Highway 54 (Wisconsin)
  Highway 73 (Wisconsin)
  Highway 80 (Wisconsin)
  Highway 97 (Wisconsin)
  Highway 173 (Wisconsin)
  Highway 186 (Wisconsin)

Railroads
Canadian National

Buses
List of intercity bus stops in Wisconsin

Airports
 KMFI - Marshfield Municipal Airport
 KISW - South Wood County Airport

Government
Wood County has a 19-member board of supervisors, each member representing a district.

Communities

Cities
 Marshfield (partly in Marathon County)
 Nekoosa
 Pittsville
 Wisconsin Rapids (county seat)

Villages

 Arpin
 Auburndale
 Biron
 Hewitt
 Milladore (partly in Portage County)
 Port Edwards
 Rudolph
 Vesper

Towns

 Arpin
 Auburndale
 Cameron
 Cary
 Cranmoor
 Dexter
 Grand Rapids
 Hansen
 Hiles
 Lincoln
 Marshfield
 Milladore
 Port Edwards
 Remington
 Richfield
 Rock
 Rudolph
 Saratoga
 Seneca
 Sherry
 Sigel
 Wood

Census-designated places
 Babcock
 Lake Wazeecha

Unincorporated communities

 Altdorf
 Bakerville
 Bethel
 Blenker
 Cranmoor
 Dexterville
 Eight Corners
 Kellner (partial)
 Lindsey
 Nasonville
 Sherry
 Veedum
 Walker

Politics
Wood County has voted Republican in presidential elections from 1940 to 1992, the only exception being Lyndon B. Johnson in 1964. In 1996, Bill Clinton snapped a 28-year Republican streak in the county, taking 45.1% of the vote compared to Bob Dole's 39%. The county became a swing county during the 2000s, giving 49 and 51 percent of the vote to George W. Bush in both elections, and 55 percent to Obama in 2008. Donald Trump garnered 56 percent of the vote in Wood County in 2016.

See also
 National Register of Historic Places listings in Wood County, Wisconsin

References

Further reading
 Commemorative Biographical Record of the Upper Wisconsin Counties of Waupaca, Portage, Wood, Marathon, Lincoln, Oneida, Vilas, Langlade and Shawano. Chicago: J. H. Beers, 1895.
 Jones, George O. and Norman S. McVean (comp.). History of Wood County, Wisconsin. Minneapolis: H. C. Cooper, Jr., 1923.

External links
 Wood County government website
 Wood County map from the Wisconsin Department of Transportation
 Wisconsin Rapids & Wood County History

 
1856 establishments in Wisconsin
Populated places established in 1856